Joseph Pease, 2nd Baron Gainford (1889–1971) was a British hereditary peer and member of the Pease family.

Family
He was the only son of the Liberal peer Jack Pease, 1st Baron Gainford and his wife Ethel Havelock-Allan, a daughter of Sir Henry Havelock-Allan, 1st Baronet  He married 1921, Veronica Margaret Noble, (died 1995) daughter of Sir George John William Noble, 2nd Baronet.

Their children were:
 Joseph Pease, 3rd Baron Gainford (1921-2013)
 George Pease, 4th Baron Gainford (1926-2022)
 John Michael Pease (1930–2007)

Career
Pease was educated at Eton College and reached the rank of Major in the British Army. He fought in both world wars before becoming Baron in 1943. He died in September 1971.

Arms

References

Gainford, Joseph Pease, 2nd Baron
Gainford, Joseph Pease, 2nd Baron
Gainford, Joseph Pease, 2nd Baron
Joseph Pease, 2nd Baron Gainford